"Riser" is a song recorded by American country music artist Dierks Bentley. It was released to radio on June 15, 2015 as the fifth and final single from his seventh studio album of the same name. The song was written by Travis Meadows and Steve Moakler.

Commercial reception

The song debuted at No. 58 on the Country Airplay chart, and No. 49 on the Hot Country Songs chart in March 2014 on the album was released, selling 8,000 copies. It only re-entered the charts the following year in July 2015 after it was released as a single. It has sold 179,000 copies in the US as of January 2016.

Music video
The music video was directed by Wes Edwards and premiered in September 2015.

Charts performance

Year-end charts

Certifications

References

Country ballads
2010s ballads
2015 singles
Dierks Bentley songs
2014 songs
Capitol Records Nashville singles
Music videos directed by Wes Edwards
Songs written by Steve Moakler
Songs written by Travis Meadows
Song recordings produced by Ross Copperman